Kani Seyyed Morad (also Romanized as Kānī Seyyed Morād; also known as Kānī Şeyd Morād) is a village in Saral Rural District, Saral District, Divandarreh County, Kurdistan Province, Iran. At the 2006 census, its population was 128, in 26 families. The village is populated by Kurds.

References 

Towns and villages in Divandarreh County
Kurdish settlements in Kurdistan Province